Trine Christiansen is a former Danish international cricketer who represented the Danish national team between 1989 and 1997.

References

Living people
Danish women cricketers
Denmark women One Day International cricketers
Year of birth missing (living people)